The WNC Championship was a professional wrestling championship owned by the Wrestling New Classic (WNC) promotion. The title was a spiritual successor to the Smash Championship, the top title of WNC's predecessor, Smash. The championship was first announced at a press conference on September 28, 2012, when it was announced that a single-elimination tournament to determine the inaugural champion would take place from October 26 to December 27. In storyline, the championship belt was donated to WNC by the final Smash Champion Dave Finlay, who was also named the head of the WNC Championship Committee, which decides matches for the title.

Like most professional wrestling championships, the title is won as a result of a scripted match. There were five reigns shared among five wrestlers.

History

Championship tournament

On September 28, 2012, Tajiri, the founder of Wrestling New Classic (WNC), announced the creation of the WNC Championship, with an eight-man single-elimination tournament starting on October 26 in Korakuen Hall. The eight participants were announced as Tajiri, Akira, Hajime Ohara, StarBuck, Carlito, Tommy Dreamer and two unnamed participants labeled only as "1st Future" and "2nd Future". On October 3, Tajiri and WNC president Tsutomu Takashima decided the first round matchups via random draw. Three days later, another random draw picked Yusuke Kodama and Adam Angel out of a group of six younger WNC wrestlers to take the "Future" spots in the tournament. The first three first round matches took place on October 26 and saw Akira defeat Adam Angel, Hajime Ohara defeat the inaugural Smash Champion StarBuck and Tajiri defeat Carlito. The final first round match took place on November 26 and saw Tommy Dreamer defeat Yusuke Kodama to advance. In the semifinals two days later, Akira defeated Tommy Dreamer, while Tajiri defeated Hajime Ohara, setting up a final match between the two veterans. On December 27, Akira defeated Tajiri to become the inaugural WNC Champion.

Title history

See also
Wrestling New Classic
WNC Women's Championship
Smash Championship

References

External links
Wrestling New Classic's official website

Heavyweight wrestling championships